Alexandre Sebastião André is an Angolan politician for the CASA–CE and a member of the National Assembly of Angola.

As of May 2018, he was the vice-president of CASA-CE.

References

Year of birth missing (living people)
Living people
Members of the National Assembly (Angola)
Angolan politicians